The Strand Barracks is the former army barracks on Clancy's Strand in Limerick city, Ireland.

1774 to 1800s

The barracks dates from the 18th century, founded in 1774, and lies on the banks of the River Shannon. It was a former workhouse called the House of Industry, built to help the destitute of Limerick city. The barrack-master in 1774 was Captain Matthew Manby (died 1774), father of George Manby.

British Garrison
It later became a British Army Barracks during the 19th century, until it was handed over to the Free State. Amongst the last British Regiments to leave the Barracks were the Oxfordshire and Buckinghamshire Light Infantry 1st Battalion and the Royal Army Service Corps consisting of No. 1166 Motor Transport Company and Divisional Supply Column.

Irish Garrison

Under the Anglo-Irish Treaty (which marked the end of the Irish War of Independence), the complex was handed over to troops of the Irish Free State on March 1, 1922. Due to escalating tensions between Free State and Republican troops, the barracks were handed over to Republican forces on March 5, as part of a truce agreement agreed between Liam Lynch, Commandant of the Republican Forces, and Commandant General Michael Brennan of the Free State Army. Towards the end of March the barracks was commanded by Connie (Mackey) McNamara.

At the height of the Irish Civil War, the barracks was besieged by Free State troops under the command of Commandant General Michael Brennan between the July 15–20, 1922. In the late evening of July 20, Captain McNamara surrendered control of the barracks to the Free State forces. The bullet holes from the conflict are still visible in the neighbouring houses.

The Free State then used the Barracks as a training Depot, and troops there were used in the Cork and Kerry landings in August 1922. The barracks housed forces of the Free State Army through the remainder of the Irish Civil War and for 13 years was home to units of the Southern Command of the Irish Defence Forces. The Barracks was then handed over to the Limerick Corporation in 1935.

1930s to present
The barracks was then taken over by Limerick Corporation and became their works yard. It passed out of their hands in 1990, where it has now become the Castle Court complex of two-storey houses and apartments.

References

Irish Free State
Irish military bases
Barracks in the Republic of Ireland
Limerick (city)